Ling is a surname which can be of either Chinese, English, or Nordic origin.

Chinese
"Ling" is the Roman alphabet spelling of multiple Chinese surnames.

Líng
According to traditional stories, the surname pronounced Líng in Mandarin originated during the Zhou Dynasty as an occupational surname for a court official responsible for the storage and handling of ice. King Wu of Zhou's brother  had a son who held this post, and Kang Shu's descendants later adopted Líng as their surname.

Ling Cao (died 203), Eastern Han dynasty military officer serving under the warlords Sun Ce and Sun Quan
Ling Tong (189–217), Eastern Han Dynasty military officer, son of Ling Cao
Ling Mengchu (凌濛初, 1580–1644), Ming Dynasty writer
Ling Shuhua (1900–1990), Chinese modernist writer
Ling Yun (politician) (born 1917), first Minister of State Security of the People's Republic of China
Gilbert Ling (born 1919), Chinese-born American biologist
Ling Qing (1923–2010), Chinese diplomat 
Ivy Ling Po (born 1939), Hong Kong actress
Ling Li (writer) (born 1942), Chinese writer and historian
Ling Jing-huan (fl. 1950s), Taiwanese basketball player
James Sik Hung Ling (born 1951), Hong Kong Salvation Army pastor
Laura Ling (born 1976), American journalist
Lisa Ling (born 1973), American journalist, television presenter, and author
Ling Yong (born 1978), Chinese Paralympic athlete
Ling Wan Ting (born 1980), Hong Kong badminton player
Ling Jie (born 1982), Chinese artistic gymnast
Ling Cong (born 1985), Chinese football player
Ling Zihan (born 1987), Chinese technology businesswoman
Kang Ling (born 1997), Chinese racing driver
Andrew Ling, Hong Kong violist
Charles Ling, Chinese-born Canadian computer scientist
Doris Ling-Cohan, American judge on the New York Supreme Court
L.H.M. Ling, American scholar of international affairs

Lìng
There is also a less-common surname pronounced Lìng in Mandarin. In some cases, it may be a shortened version of the surname Linghu. People with this surname include:
Ling Zhengce (born 1952), Chinese politician
Ling Jihua (born 1956), Chinese politician
Huping Ling (born 1956), Chinese-born American historian
Ling Wancheng (born 1960), Chinese businessman

Regional pronunciation of Lín
"Ling" may also be an Eastern Min, Northern Min, or Wu transcription of the surname pronounced in Mandarin as Lín. People with this surname spelled as "Ling" include:
Ling How Doong (1934–2021), Singaporean politician and lawyer
Ling Liong Sik (born 1943), Malaysian politician
Victor Ling (born 1943), Chinese-born Canadian medical researcher
Jahja Ling (born 1951), Indonesian-born American orchestral conductor
Tschen La Ling (born 1956), Dutch football player
John Wey Ling (born ), Chinese-born American ballet dancer 
Alan Ling Sie Kiong (born 1983), Malaysian lawyer
Julia Ling (born 1983), American television actress
Landon Ling (born 1987), Canadian football player

Other Chinese characters
One other rare surname also pronounced Líng in Mandarin is believed to be used by only eight people in China. People with this surname include:
Ling Kai (born 1986), Singaporean singer-songwriter

The following Chinese people have the surname Ling, but the characters for their Chinese names are not known:
 Jonathan Ling (born ), Australian businessman of Chinese descent, CEO of Fletcher Building
 Pam Ling (born 1968), American reality show actress of Chinese descent

The Vietnamese surname Linh originated from the Vietnamese pronunciation of a different character pronounced Líng in Mandarin, which is not used as a surname in Chinese.

Other
The English surname Ling, also spelled Linge, may have two different origins: one from a word used in Lincolnshire meaning "heath", and the other as a toponymic surname referring to the parish of Lyng, Somerset. Lings is a variant of the English surname Ling, with addition of an epenthetic s. 

 Nicholas Ling, London publisher, bookseller, and editor 
 Pehr Henrik Ling (1766–1839), Swedish medical-gymnastic practitioner
 Christopher Ling (1880-1953), English soldier and cricketer
 Archie Ling (1881–1943), English football player
 David W. Ling (1890–1965), American federal judge
 William Ling (cricketer) (1891–1960), South African cricketer
 William Ling (referee) (1908–1984), English football referee
 Anthony Ling (1910–1987), British cricket player
 James Ling (1922–2004), American founder of Ling-Temco-Vought
 Daniel Ling (1926–2003), Canadian scholar who studied the teaching of speech to deaf children
 Peter Ling (1926–2006), British scriptwriter and novelist
 Robin Ling (1927–2017), English surgeon who invented the Exeter hip system
 John Ling (1933–2005), British diplomat, farmer, politician and writer
 Sergey Ling (born 1937), Belarusian politician
 Staffan Ling (born 1944), Swedish actor and television presenter
 Richard Ling (born 1954), American communications scholar
 Martin Ling (born 1966), English football manager
 Tanya Ling (born 1966), Indian fashion designer
 Jamie Ling (born 1973), Canadian ice hockey player
 Björn A. Ling (born 1974), Swedish actor and bandy player
 David Ling (born 1975), Canadian professional ice hockey player
 Cameron Ling (born 1981), Australian rules footballer
 Edward Ling (born 1983), British sport shooter
 Adam Ling (born 1991), New Zealand rower
 Andy Ling, British trance artist and remixer

People with the surname Lings include:

Martin Lings (1909–2005), English philosophical writer
Stephen Lings, English wildlife artist

Fictional characters
 Francine Smith (née Ling) from the animated television series American Dad!
 Ling Xiaoyu from the Tekken video game series
 Ling Zhen from the classical novel Water Margin
 Mei Ling, a guest character from the cartoon series What's New, Scooby-Doo?, in the episode "Block-Long Hong Kong Terror"
 Penny Ling, from Littlest Pet Shop
 Lynn Minmay from Robotech
 Ling, a character from the Mulan series

References

Chinese-language surnames
Multiple Chinese surnames